Edward Batchelor (4 August 1930 – 19 November 2006) was an English footballer who played in the Football League as a wing half or centre half for Swindon Town. He began his career with Wolverhampton Wanderers, but never played for them in the league, and after leaving Swindon, went on to make 48 appearances for Southern League club Bath City. He retired from the game in 1960, and together with wife Jean, ran a newsagents in Swindon.

References

1930 births
2006 deaths
Sportspeople from Rugby, Warwickshire
English footballers
Association football wing halves
Wolverhampton Wanderers F.C. players
Swindon Town F.C. players
Bath City F.C. players
English Football League players
Southern Football League players